Aegilops speltoides (syn. Sitopsis speltoides (Tausch) Á.Löve) is an edible plant in the family Poaceae native to Southeastern Europe and Western Asia, which is often used for animal feed, and it has grown in cultivated beds. This plant is an important natural source of disease resistance in wheat, and it is known or likely to be susceptible to barley mild mosaic bymovirus.

References
 Brunt, A.A., Crabtree, K., Dallwitz, M.J., Gibbs, A.J., Watson, L. and Zurcher, E.J. (eds.)  (1996 onwards).  Barley mild mosaic bymovirus. Plant Viruses Online: Descriptions and Lists from the VIDE Database. Version: 20 August 1996.

External links

Plants For A Future: Aegilops speltoides 

USDA Plants Profile: Aegilops speltoides

speltoides
Flora of Western Asia
Flora of Europe
Flora of Palestine (region)
Forages